Balerno High School is a six-year secondary school located in Balerno, a suburb of Edinburgh, Scotland. The school stands on the banks of the Water of Leith, and serves children from Balerno, Kirknewton and Ratho, and also hosts pupils from a variety of areas outside the catchment area such as Currie, East Calder, Mid Calder, Edinburgh and Livingston.

Headteacher and SMT

The head teacher is Neil McCallum. He is assisted by his management team which consists of deputy heads Lisa Coffey and Roslyn Ranger, and business manager Linda Parkes.

History
The first record of a school in Balerno refers to one set up in 1814. Its purpose was to teach English. There were 75 pupils and the teacher was paid £25 per year. In 1872 elementary education became compulsory and a new school was needed. In 1877 what is currently the Dean Park Primary School 'annexe' became Dean Park Primary School itself (the school has since moved to a different site in Balerno) and the red brick building, now Jigsaw Nursery School, was the teacher's house. Balerno was also served by St Mungo's Episcopal School. Until the 1970s, secondary education involved Balerno, Ratho and Kirknewton children travelling long distances. With the rapid population growth in the Balerno area (1000 people in 1960, 15,000 in 1995), plans were drawn up for a £4,600,000 community school and builders prepared to go on site in April 1980. The Edinburgh Evening News reported a "shock rethink" as late as January 1980 which would "examine the consequences of not proceeding with the project". The Council even considered the feasibility of expanding places at nearby Currie and Firrhill High Schools. Balerno Community High School was opened to pupils from first to third years in August 1983. The school has since expanded to accommodate first to sixth year pupils.

Famous people

Notable alumni

Craig Gordon - Scottish footballer (goalkeeper)
 Boards of Canada - brothers Michael and Marcus Sandison, musicians
 Eunice Olumide - model and performer
 Michael Deacon (journalist) - political sketch writer, Daily Telegraph
 Nina Nesbitt - singer

Teachers
JJ Chalmers - Scottish television presenter and Invictus Games medallist

References

Bibliography

External links

Educational institutions established in 1983
Secondary schools in Edinburgh
1983 establishments in Scotland